Trelewis Welfare A.F.C. are a Welsh football club from the village of Trelewis, Merthyr Tydfill in Wales. They played in the Welsh Football League for 27 seasons. The club folded in 2014. In 2020 the club reformed and entered the Merthyr & District League.

Honours

 Welsh Football League Division Two (Third Tier) – Champions: 1980–81
 Welsh Football League Division Two (Third Tier) – Runners-Up: 1987–88
 Welsh Football League Cup – Runners-Up: 1981-82
 South Wales Amateur League Division Two – Runners-Up: 2011–12
 Rhymney Valley League – Champions: 1967–68
 Rhymney Valley Senior Cup – Winners: 1966–67

Welsh Football League history
Information sourced from the Football Club History Database and the Welsh Soccer Archive.

Notes

References

Football clubs in Wales
2014 disestablishments in Wales
Association football clubs disestablished in 2014
South Wales Amateur League clubs
Welsh Football League clubs
Merthyr and District League clubs